Havana is a 1990 American drama film starring Robert Redford, Lena Olin, Alan Arkin and Raul Julia, directed by Sydney Pollack with music by Dave Grusin. The film's plot concerns Jack Weil (Redford), an American professional gambler who decides to visit Havana, Cuba to gamble in 1958 on the eve of the Cuban Revolution.

Plot

The film is set on the eve of the Cuban Revolution's victory. On Christmas Eve, 1958, aboard the boat from Miami to Havana, Roberta Duran enlists the aid of Jack Weil in smuggling U.S. Army Signal Corps radios destined for the revolutionaries in the hills. Weil agrees only because he is romantically interested in her. When they rendezvous for the "payoff," Roberta reveals that she is married, dashing Weil's hopes. In Havana, Weil meets up with a Cuban journalist acquaintance and during a night on the town, they run into Roberta and her husband, Dr. Arturo Duran. Duran is a Revolutionary leader. Duran invites Weil to join them for dinner and asks Weil for further aid to the cause. Weil turns him down, even after Duran outlines the desperate situation confronting the Cuban majority.

After a night of debauchery, Weil reads a newspaper account of Duran's arrest and death. In shock, he continues with the planned poker game, coincidentally meeting the head of the secret police. He learns that Roberta was also arrested and tortured in custody. He pressures another player in debt to him to obtain her release. Shaken by her husband's death and her own experience in jail, she agrees to let him shelter her in his apartment but disappears that afternoon.

Realizing that he is in love with Roberta and encouraged by an old gambling friend, Weil drives into Cuba's interior to find her at Duran's old estate. He persuades her to return with him to Havana and to leave Cuba with him. When she asks, he explains that a lump on his arm contains a diamond that he had sewn into his arm in his youth as insurance. He makes arrangements for her to leave Cuba via boat, but on his return to the apartment, he is assaulted by two Cubans, who inform him that Duran demands him to get Roberta out of the country. Weil has an acquaintance from CIA, Marion Chigwell, who confirms that Duran is still alive. He intimidates Chigwell to work with him toward freeing Duran.

Pretending to work for the CIA, Weil goes to see Duran, who is held by the chief of the secret police (SIM). He tells the chief that Washington, DC, has new plans for Duran and wants him released, with a payoff of $50,000. He "orders" the chief to have Duran cleaned up and dressed (Duran had been tortured and was in extremely bad shape) and taken to his house. Weil goes to a doctor and then a jeweler to sell the diamond to raise the cash for Duran's release. He tells Roberta, who had decided to make a life with him, that her husband is still alive. In shock, she leaves on her own to find her husband. Meanwhile, Weil had blown the big game with high rollers, for whom he had been angling since the day he arrived in Havana.  The casino's manager, Joe Volpi, forgives him, knowing he had made rescuing Roberta his priority.

On New Year's Eve, 1959, the insurrection is won by the revolutionaries.  The upper class, the government, and the secret police all leave their lavish parties to make a mad dash to the ports and airport to leave the country. The people pour into the streets, celebrating the victory by trashing the casinos and dancing. Weil and Volpi agree that it is time for them to leave. The next morning, Weil is in a restaurant preparing to depart. He sees Chigwell who informs him that he is working on a new book now, "The Cuisine of Indochina." Roberta shows up to wish him farewell. She sees the bandage on his arm and discovers it had cost him to save her husband for her. They hug goodbye. She remains with the Revolution, and he has been changed by it.

Four years later in 1963, Jack drives down to the Florida Keys and gazes across the sea toward Havana, hoping to see a boat that might bring Roberta on board. He knows the ferry is no longer running. However, he does this every year in the hopes he might someday see Roberta again. He also realizes that the changes in Cuba were being echoed in the changes of the 1960s happening in the United States. It is a new decade.

Cast
 Robert Redford as Jack Weil, A professional gambler, Jack used to be in the U.S. Navy and served in World War II's Pacific Theater, stating that he was at Pearl Harbor when it was bombed. Jack comes to Havana to gamble but finds himself getting caught up in the Cuban Revolution.
 Lena Olin as Bobby Durán, Swedish by birth, Bobby moved to California to become an actress then went to Mexico when her first husband got blacklisted. When she came to Havana, she soon married Arturo Duran.
 Alan Arkin as Joe Volpi, Manager of a popular Havana casino, Joe works for infamous Jewish-American mobster Meyer Lansky. Joe is an old friend of Jack.
 Raul Julia (Uncredited) as Arturo Durán, A member of an old, wealthy family, Arturo is a figurehead in the revolution but must keep his activities to a minimum in Havana.
 Tomás Milián as Menocal, A colonel in the secret police, Menocal answers to Batista and tries to keep Havana under control through abduction and murder. Menocal is against the revolution because he believes no matter who is in charge someone always will suffer.
 Daniel Davis as Marion Chigwell, A writer for Gourmet magazine, Marion is frequently seen around Havana trying food at restaurants.
 Tony Plana as Julio Ramos, A friend of Jack and a reporter, Julio is sympathetic to the revolution.
 Betsy Brantley as Diane: An American tourist who meets Jack at a bar.
 Lise Cutter as Patty, Diane's friend.
 Richard Farnsworth as The Professor, An old gambler who gives Jack relationship advice.
 Mark Rydell as Meyer Lansky, The infamous Jewish mobster, he is head of Mafia operations in Havana, owning many of Havana's casinos.
 Vasek Simek as Willy
 Fred Asparagus as Baby Hernández
 Richard Portnow as Mike MacClaney
 Dion Anderson as Roy Forbes
 Carmine Caridi as Captain Potts

Production

	

Filming began on November 22, 1989, and was completed on April 28, 1990. Sydney Pollack hoped to film in Havana. However, U.S. law would not allow the producers to spend any U.S. dollars in Cuba, U.S. citizens could not legally enter Cuba, and relations between the U.S. and Cuba in 1989 were not conducive to filming an American motion picture in Havana. Thus, it was decided to make the entire film in the Dominican Republic. The vegetation was the same, and Santo Domingo offered certain architectural similarities, though not a wide boulevard like Havana's famous El Prado (Paseo de Marti). The end scene was filmed in Key West, Florida.

Tomás Milián, who played the Batista's head of secret police, had lived in Cuba during the 1950s and commented that the film recreated Havana during the Batista regime's last days in great detail.  Many of the extras were exiled Cubans who had moved to the Dominican Republic.  According to Sydney Pollack, "The atmosphere became quite emotional... They remembered the old days in Havana.  Our set took them back 30 years."

The film's main set, informally called "The Big Set", was a quarter-mile long (400 m) street surrounded by façades representing casinos, restaurants, and hotels.  Interior scenes were shot in replicated casino floors, room suites, and cafes. The Prado was reconstructed at a former airbase in the Dominican Republic. To replicate it, a team of about 300 tradesmen was used, and over 80 neon signs needed to be made in the U.S. and shipped to the Dominican Republic. The set took 20 weeks to construct. Costume designer Bernie Pollock had to outfit 2,000 extras with costumes and needed 8000–10,000 costumes for frequent changes during different scenes of the film.  Besides 1950s period clothing, there were large numbers of hats, accessories, jewelry, and gloves, along with 1950s Cuban military uniforms.  The wardrobe items were brought in from both Los Angeles and England. About one hundred 1950s vintage American automobiles, buses, and trucks appear in the film.

The version of "Rum and Coca-Cola" by The Andrews Sisters is a re-recorded version from 1961 from their DOT Records album Greatest Hits, which was recorded two years after the film's setting.

Raul Julia chose to remain uncredited because the film's producers would not give him above-the-title credit alongside Robert Redford and Lena Olin.

Reception
The reviews were generally negative. The film has a 27% rating on Rotten Tomatoes based on 26 reviews with the consensus: "Handsomely produced and dramatically inert, Havana squanders its convincing recreation of pre-revolution Cuba by using it as a disconnected backdrop to a turgid romance." On a budget of $40 million, Havana made only $9 million in the United States and Canada but grossed $27 million overseas for a worldwide total of $36 million.

The musical score received Golden Globe, Oscar, and Grammy nominations. It was one of Dave Grusin's more acclaimed scores.

See also
 Havana (soundtrack)
 Cuba (1979 film)

References

External links
 
 
 
 
 

1990 films
1990 romantic drama films
American romantic drama films
Films scored by Dave Grusin
Films directed by Sydney Pollack
Films about the Cuban Revolution
Films set in 1958
Films set in Havana
Films set in the 1950s
Films shot in the Dominican Republic
Films about gambling
Seafaring films based on actual events
Universal Pictures films
Cultural depictions of Meyer Lansky
1990s English-language films
1990s American films